Natalya Solntseva  is a best-selling Russian author of mystical detective stories.

Biography
Not much is known about Natalya Solntseva's private life. This causes rumors that she is a man writing under the female alias, or a project of writers, historians and editors. None of them are true, but since Natalya gives only online interviews and eagerly tells the readers about her work and never about her family and other private things, she stays mysterious as well as her novels.

In her interviews, she says the following about her bio, education and principles:

“My bio is told in my books – by pieces, fragments, episodes, reflected in the characters’ features and fates. The author's personality should not be more important than the fruit of his/her labor. The author transfers his feelings and views through the books, and it is them which help to know the author better”.

“My education has nothing to do with literature, but is closely connected to art. But I am not an art critic or historian, I just love to create. I tried different ways of expressing my creativity, and obtained important skills from each of them”.

“I do not like texts full of slang and vulgarity. There is a lot of vulgarity everywhere. When the person opens a book, he wants to set free from routine, to find out something new and to get a new view of the past, to go through the adventure, love and victory together with the characters. …. Centuries are passing by, but people do not change. They are thinking about the same – live and death, love and hatred, happiness and misery. Only the surroundings change so it is not so difficult to glance into the history. Ancient clothes, way of life and culture – they all are just a framework for the eternal story”.

Career

The first book by Natalya Solntseva, The third birth of the Phoenix, was published in 2007. Since then more than 40 books were published and more than 1 million copies was sold. These books are considered the best mystical detectives in modern Russia.

Natalya Solntseva's books contain everything which attracts readers – action, historical facts, mystical settings and deep insight into the human psychology. Her novels are like labyrinths which transform the reader making him share adventures with the characters.

Natalya Soltnseva's novels give the reader fresh look at the usual things, help to entertain people when they are free of daily responsibilities and get read of everyday stress and routine. They are also like a visit to the botanical garden where you can find exotic plants. The author uses intrigue and action to plunge deep into the human soul and warn the reader about the dark secrets of his unconsciousness.

The central “characters” of each novel are sacred objects, or artefacts. They are unique objects or phenomena with mystical properties; they cannot be called typical even when they were made. They contain the secret of the supreme forces or the human talent.

The author chooses rare objects for her novels, which are not mentioned in the history's records, but could exist during the specific period (golden bees of the Merovingian, philosopher's stone of Yakov (James) Bruce, gold bowl of the Scythian, the Star of Sumerian goddess Ishtar, sand glass of Catherine de Medicis’ astrologer, ring of pharaoh Thothmes, casket of the famous poisoner, gold disc from Queen of Sheba's treasury). The events take place during the various periods in history- ancient India, Babylon, Paris in the 16th century, the Dark Age, Moscow in the 19th century and of course, current Russia. The author also uses famous myths which perfectly match her mystical stories – Roman myth about the goddess Proserpina, Greek myth about Theseus, myths about Cupid and Psyche, the horrible goddess Hecate and the beautiful goddess Venus, fabulous bird Phoenix, etc. The choice of artifact, myth and historical epoch always contributes to the plot of Natalya's books.

List of works
 Mystical detective series:
Diabolical train. Soon.
Follow me, (2015). A virtual mystical detective.

Gloria and other series (about a detective-medium Gloria Golitsyn):
Mines of Queen of Sheba / Копи царицы Савской (2011).
Portrait of the cavalier dressed in a blue jacket / Портрет кавалера в голубом камзоле (2011).
The Dance of Seven Veils / Танец семи вуалей (2012).
Demon of noon / Полуденный демон (2012).
Still life with a silver vase / Натюрморт с серебряной вазой (2013).
The Cheat with the Ace of Diamonds / Шулер с бубновым тузом (2013).
Gioconda e Pagliaccio / Джоконда и паяц (2014).
Elixir for Joan of Arc / Эликсир для Жанны Д'Арк (2014).
A Passenger from the Titanic / Пассажирка с "Титаника" (2014).
The Jaguar's Leap / Прыжок ягуара (2015).
Kamasutra from Shiva / Камасутра от Шивы (2015).
This series is devoted to adventures and investigations of Gloria Golitsyn who inherited the gift and the house of the famous “modern magus”. With all this she also inherited his clients. She started to help people understand the weirdest events which were programmed by the superior forces, ancient objects, inhuman creatures, etc.

Gold series (tetralogy about golden artifacts of Mayan and Atlantis):
In the temple of Sun the trees are made of gold / В Храме Солнца деревья золотые.
In the mountains closer to the sky/ В горах ближе к небу.
Traces of Gods.
Soft steps in the Ocean / Легкие шаги в Океане.
This series is about mysteries of gold, the metal which is the measure of all valuable things. The author explores the story of the ancient Atlantis as it could be and even other civilizations. Those stories develop in modern Russia – in its capital Moscow and far off in the mountains.

Playing with the Colors of Death series (tetralogy about artifacts of Ancient Egypt, Ancient India and the mystical Order of the Black Rose):
Await the pilgrim on a stormy day / Ожидай странника в день бури.
What dream of blood means / К чему снится кровь.
Beware of Serpent Queen’s Glance / Опасайся взгляда Царицы Змей.
All Coincidences Are Not Incidental / Все совпадения неслучайны.
This series is almost esoteric as each novel can be associated with nature's season or the suit of Tarot cards. However it has a clear plot. The books are about people who find out that they should leave their everyday life to find their inner force, to get back the sacred objects they owned before, and to make the final choice.

Cassandra's Gardens series (two volumes of the cult of the Greek goddess Hecate and her Sacred Ring):
Do not be afraid of the deep / Не бойся глубины.
The weed’s diary / Дневник сорной травы.

Astra Eltcov. Eros and crime series (about paranormal crimes of past centuries):
Rendezvous in Halloween / Свидание в Хэллоуин.
Last repast of a whore / Последняя трапеза блудницы.
Siegfried`s Dagger / Кинжал Зигфрида.
The Golden Idol of Ognebog / Золотой идол Огнебога.
Three Columbine's deaths / Три смерти Коломбины.
Vacation in a villa with a ghost / Отпуск на вилле с призраком.
Spy, actress and Royal Cup / Шпион, актриса и Царский кубок.
The Star of Babylon / Звезда Вавилона.
Mantle with golden bees / Мантия с золотыми пчелами.
Red Lion of the Druids / Красный Лев друидов.
The main character of this series is Astra Eltsov who investigates “mystical” crimes where people are concerned not only with finding the criminal, but rather the reason and the way to protect themselves from curses, bad omens and fatal events.

Eva and Vseslav. Unusual investigation series (about modern adventures of magical artifacts):
Chellini's Venus / Венера Челлини.
The Treasure of Kitezh City / Сокровище Китеж-града.
The Etruscan Mirror / Этрусское зеркало.
The Third Birth of Phoenix / Третье рождение Феникса.
The Shakespeare’s Charade / Шарада Шекспира.
Ancient Goddess’s Poison / Яд древней богини.
The Moscow Labyrinth of Minotaur / Московский лабиринт Минотавра.
The Pharaoh's Seal / Печать фараона.
Princess from Shanghai / Принцесса из Шанхая.

Non-series books:
French Angel in a pocket / Французский ангел в кармане.
Spanish chess / Испанские шахматы.
She read for the night / Она читала на ночь.
Viking’s Amulet, collection of mystery short stories/ Амулет викинга, сборник рассказов.

External links
 Solntseva's site
Solntseva's site
 Solntseva's personal blog
Solntseva Amazon's novels

Year of birth missing (living people)
Living people
Russian women novelists